Philip Pitt Campbell (April 25, 1862 – May 26, 1941) was a U.S. Representative from Kansas.

Biography
Born in Cape Breton, Nova Scotia, Canada, Campbell moved with his parents to Neosho County, Kansas, in 1867.
He attended the common schools, and was graduated from Baker University, Baldwin City, Kansas, in 1888.
He studied law.
He was admitted to the bar in 1889 and commenced practice in Pittsburg, Kansas.

Campbell was elected as a Republican to the Fifty-eighth and to the nine succeeding Congresses (March 4, 1903 – March 3, 1923).
He served as chairman of the Committee on Levees and Improvements of the Mississippi River (Sixty-first Congress), Committee on Rules (Sixty-sixth and Sixty-seventh Congresses).
He was an unsuccessful candidate for reelection in 1922 to the Sixty-eighth Congress.
Parliamentarian of the Republican National Convention in 1924.
He resumed the practice of law in Washington, D.C., with residence in Arlington, Virginia.

He died in Washington, D.C., May 26, 1941. He was interred in Abbey Mausoleum in Arlington County, Virginia.

References

1862 births
1941 deaths
Virginia Republicans
Republican Party members of the United States House of Representatives from Kansas
People from Cape Breton Island